Machaq Marka (Aymara machaqa new, marka village, "new village", also spelled Machaj Marca) is a mountain in the Bolivian Andes which reaches a height of approximately . It is located in the La Paz Department, Loayza Province, Luribay Municipality. Machaq Marka lies northeast of Lawrani and Qullpani.

References 

Mountains of La Paz Department (Bolivia)